Niaré Benogo (born 27 August 1992) is a Malian footballer who plays as a midfielder.

Club career
Benogo made his professional debut for Spartak Trnava against AS Trenčín on 13 September 2015.

References

External links
 Fortuna Liga profile
 Futbalnet profile
 

1992 births
Living people
Malian footballers
Association football midfielders
International Allies F.C. players
FC Spartak Trnava players
Slovak Super Liga players
Expatriate footballers in Ghana
Expatriate footballers in Slovakia
Malian expatriate sportspeople in Ghana
Malian expatriate sportspeople in Slovakia
21st-century Malian people